Sweet Electra is a musical group that originated in Guadalajara, Mexico. Their musical style can be defined as electronic, rock, and indie. The band has participated in many national and international music festivals in Mexico and has achieved international recognition.

Biography
Musician, DJ, and producer Giovanni Escalera, was introduced to Guadalajara city's electronic scene in 1996 along with Venancio Almanza, a musician and producer (currently a member of the group Club Nova). Together they created a group called "Nick Vega", which later changed its name to "Billy Camarena". Their music is a mix of electronic with drums, bass, and lounge components. After the dissolution of the group, Giovanni and DJ Channel Dueñas continued with independent projects, including "Acid Chloe", which would later become "Sweet Electra".

In early 2002, Sweet Electra signed with the record company Nopal Beat Records and released their debut album, Lying to be Sweet. Production was at the expense of Giovanni Escalera and Guillermo Ramirez (Galapago);  with performances from Valentina Gonzáles (vocals), Paloma Cumplido (violin), and Abigail Vázquez (violin).  On the same album Sweet Electra also worked with Chemin, Arturo Santillanes Plástiko, and Troker. The album featured Morfeo Hernández (percussion) and Juan Carlos Lorenzana (transverse flute). The single "Firefly" has remixes of Calambrin, Shock Bukara, and Club Nova. It was the first album to be promoted by Nopal Beat Records under EMI's distribution in the territories of The United States, Europe, Asia, and South America. The album is a blend of acid cabaret, deep house, and trip hop beats with elements of jazz and bossa nova. The album features extensive Mexican rhythms similar to those Artiste from the 1950s, with lyrics in four languages: Portuguese, French, English, and Spanish. The album was nominated for an LBE Music Award for best New Alternative Artist.

In 2006, the group’s second album, CAMA (Spanish for 'bed'), revealed a stronger indie-rock influence than their previous record. The album’s single, "Shadow" was also part of the soundtrack of the Mexican film Eros Una Vez María, directed by Jesus Magaña. Giovanni Escalera of Sweet Electra also scored the film under their characteristic electronic sound which includes vocal participation from Cecilia Bastida vocalist of Tijuana No!, Japanese singer Sakiko Yocko, and Mexican band musician  Dangerous Rhythm. In September 2006, Sweet Electra headed the festival Celebrate Mexico Now in New York City.

In 2009, Sweet Electra released their third album, When We Abandoned Earth. Nardiz and Giovanni crafted the songs in their new home of New York City. The album depicts a nostalgic and dramatic orchestral electronic pop style with contributions of Carlo Nicolau (violin), Juan Sosa (drums), Stephen Yonkin from Zigmat (bass). When we remixed Earth (2011) was the collaboration of DJs and producers making a more danceable version of the band's third album. The album was released only on digital distribution by Mapamondo, iTunes, etc.

Sweet Electra is the fourth album by the band which is a revisited version of the CAMA album with a stronger electronic sound that identifies the band. Photographer Erin Patrice O'Brien produced the video clip of the first single, "Creias", an animated video clip that was shot in Brooklyn, New York, using around 9,000 stills of the band interacting in a box as if they were toys, with a Mexican touch similar to Michel Gondry.

Discography

LP albums
 Lying to be Sweet (2003). EMI music
 Cama (2007). Independent 
 Eros una vez María (2007) Soundtrack. Alliance México 
 When We Abandoned Earth (2009). Independent
 When We Remixed Earth (2011). Independent
 Sweet Electra (2011)

Remixed albums
Firefly EP (remixes).  EMI music.
David Alvarado Firefly remix (Vinyl). Unique Distribution UK

Compilations
Francezco Diaz “An exciting house mix for a lovely springwalk”. Cala D’ Hort, Sweden
DJ Lani “ First class house Vol 2”. Gallo Rcds., South Africa
Latin Lounge EMI Music, U.S.
Acid Cabaret. EMI Capitol, Spain
Ida y Vuelta. La Corporación Muzic. U.S. 2007

External links
 Official Website
 Sweet Electra SoundCloud page

Musical groups from Guadalajara, Jalisco
Mexican electronic musical groups